Ugamak Island is one of the Krenitzin Islands, a subgroup of the Fox Islands group of the eastern Aleutian Islands, Alaska. Ugamak is an Aleut word transcribed by Father Veniaminov (1840) which, according to R. H. Geoghegan, may mean "ceremony island". Ugamak Bay is situated on the southeast coast of Ugamak, and Ugamak Strait is a three-mile-wide channel that separates Ugamak from Kaligagan Island to the west.

References

Krenitzin Islands
Islands of Alaska
Islands of Aleutians East Borough, Alaska